Brinda Devi, Crown Princess of Kapurthala (died 25 July 1962), was an Indian royal and a socialite, the wife of Crown Prince Paramjit Singh of Kapurthala (eldest son of Maharaja Jagatjit Singh I of Kapurthala in Punjab, British India). Her daughter was Princess Indira Devi and a sister-law, Princess Sita Devi.

The tune Let's Misbehave by Cole Porter was written for her.

Gallery

References

Bibliography

External

|-

Indian princesses
1962 deaths
People from Shimla district
Date of birth unknown